Zhu Guangqian (朱光潛; 19 September 1897 – 6 March 1986) was one of the founder of the study of aesthetics in 20th-century China.

History 
Zhu graduated from the Anhui Province Tongcheng Secondary School. After earning his BA from Hong Kong University, he went abroad to study aesthetics at the University of Edinburgh and University College, London, then to France and the University of Strasbourg where he earned his doctorate. Later, he returned to China to write The Psychology of Art, On Poetry, and A History of Western Aesthetics, Letters on Beauty. In the 1930s in Beijing, Zhu Guangqian hosted a literary salon that met monthly to recite prose and poetry, east and west. Regulars included Wen Yiduo, Chen Mengjia, Zhu Ziqing, Zheng Zhenduo, Feng Zhi, Shen Congwen, Bing Xin, Ling Shuhua, Bian Zhilin, Lin Huiyin and Xiao Qian. These were pivotal figures in Republican literature, and it can perhaps be argued that the salon was important to the formation of the so-called Beijing style literature of the period.

Portrait 
  Zhu Guangqian. A Portrait by Kong Kai Ming at Portrait Gallery of Chinese Writers (Hong Kong Baptist University Library)

1986 deaths
1897 births
Philosophers of art
Educators from Anhui
Alumni of the University of Edinburgh
People from Tongcheng, Anhui
Chinese publishers (people)
Writers from Anhui
Academic staff of Tsinghua University
Academic staff of Peking University
Academic staff of Sichuan University
Academic staff of Wuhan University
Victims of the Cultural Revolution
Republic of China translators
People's Republic of China translators
20th-century Chinese translators
Academic staff of the National Southwestern Associated University